During the 1999–2000 English football season, Scunthorpe United F.C. competed in the Football League Second Division.

Season summary
In the 1999-2000 season, after a successful play-off final win to ensure promotion the season before, Scunthorpe weren't able to maintain their Second Division status and were relegated back to the Third Division in 23rd place.

Final league table

Results
Scunthorpe United's score comes first

Legend

Football League Second Division

FA Cup

League Cup

Football League Trophy

Squad

Left club during season

References

Scunthorpe United F.C. seasons
Scunthorpe United F.C.